Woodmancote is a small village near Dursley in Gloucestershire, England.

Villages in Gloucestershire
Dursley